Xenophilia or xenophily is the love for, attraction to, or appreciation of foreign people, manners, customs, or cultures. It is the antonym of xenophobia or xenophoby. The word is a modern coinage from the Greek "xenos" (stranger, unknown, foreign) and "philia" (love, attraction), though the word itself is not found in classical Greek.

In biology
In biology xenophily includes, for example, the acceptance by an insect of an introduced foreign plant closely related to the normal host. Xenophily is distinguished from xenophagy (or allotrophy), and is less common than xenophoby. Early 20th-century entomologists incorrectly concluded that the evolution of the glandular terminal disk was a function of xenophily, following its discovery in myrmecophilous larvae.

In culture
Cultural appreciation refers to attraction or admiration towards one or more cultures which are not one's own. Individual examples are usually suffixed with -philia, from the Ancient Greek word philia (φιλία), "love, affection". 
Cultural xenophilia according to some sources can be connected with cultural cringe. It may also be area-specific, such as led the Romans to believe that Greeks were better than Romans at music, art and philosophy, but evidently not better at military matters.

In politics and history
George Washington, in his 1796 Farewell Address, described having allegiance to more than one nation as negative:

So likewise, a passionate attachment of one nation for another produces a variety of evils. Sympathy for the favorite nation, facilitating the illusion of an imaginary common interest in cases where no real common interest exists, and infusing into one the enmities of the other, betrays the former into a participation in the quarrels and wars of the latter without adequate inducement or justification. It leads also to concessions to the favorite nation of privileges denied to others which is apt doubly to injure the nation making the concessions; by unnecessarily parting with what ought to have been retained, and by exciting jealousy, ill-will, and a disposition to retaliate, in the parties from whom equal privileges are withheld. And it gives to ambitious, corrupted, or deluded citizens (who devote themselves to the favorite nation), facility to betray or sacrifice the interests of their own country, without odium, sometimes even with popularity; gilding, with the appearances of a virtuous sense of obligation, a commendable deference for public opinion, or a laudable zeal for public good, the base or foolish compliances of ambition, corruption, or infatuation.

As avenues to foreign influence in innumerable ways, such attachments are particularly alarming to the truly enlightened and independent patriot. How many opportunities do they afford to tamper with domestic factions, to practice the arts of seduction, to mislead public opinion, to influence or awe the public councils. Such an attachment of a small or weak towards a great and powerful nation dooms the former to be the satellite of the latter.

In fiction

The film Watermelon Man centers in part on a white man trying to have sex with a white woman he works with. His efforts fail until he is magically turned into an African American, at which point she is more than willing to sleep with him. It is only the following day that the protagonist realizes, to his horror, that the woman is a xenophile and only had sex with him because of his race; she had no interest in him as a person.

See also

 Allophilia
 Allosemitism
 Colonial mentality
 Cultural appropriation
 Exoticism
 Intercultural competence
 Mongrel complex
 Negrophilia
 Neophile
 Racial fetishism
 Xenocentrism

References

Admiration of foreign cultures